William Benson Mayo (7 January 1866 – 1 February 1944) was chief power engineer for the Ford Motor Company.

Biography
Mayo was born in Chatham, Massachusetts on 7 January 1866 to Andrew Stevens and Amanda Nickerson Mayo.  He worked initially as a sign painter in Boston, but accepted a position as an office boy for a manufacturer of steam engines, Hooven-Owens-Rentschler.  He became a salesman in the Boston office, then was promoted to New York.  In 1906 he moved to the corporate office in Hamilton, Ohio as a vice-president, handling the largest sales accounts.

In 1913 the company was approached by Ford to provide power generation equipment for Ford's Highland Park, Michigan complex.  Mayo became well acquainted with Henry Ford, who hired him to become the chief power engineer.  In 1917 Mayo was given primary responsibility for planning and construction of the River Rouge Plant complex.  Subsequently, he was responsible for the construction of other Ford plants, using hydro-electric power at Green Island, New York and St. Paul, Minnesota.  Ford operates a plant in St. Paul and generates hydroelectric power there to this day.

In 1919, when Edsel Ford became president of Ford, Mayo became his consultant and advisor. In 1926 he became head of Ford's Aircraft Division, which developed and built the Ford Trimotor; he was also responsible for the construction of Ford's pioneering private airport (now the location of a Ford test track) and the first airport hotel (now the Dearborn Inn). Although sometimes referred to as Ford's chief engineer, his expertise was in power distribution and facility engineering — he focused primarily on plant, rather than the automotive products.

Mayo also served as a director of the Detroit Aircraft Corporation which went into receivership in 1931 during the depression.

He elected to retire in 1932.  In retirement, he served as an officer of several transportation companies. He died in Detroit on 1 February 1944.

Sources
Henry's Lieutenants by Ford Bryan, Great Lakes Books, 1993
My Forty Years with Ford by Charles E. Sorensen, W.W. Norton, 1956

1866 births
1944 deaths
Ford people
Engineers from Massachusetts
Ford executives
People from Chatham, Massachusetts